The discography of Mis-Teeq, a British girl group, consists of two studio albums, two compilation albums, eight singles, one video album and one promotional single. Mis-Teeq were formed in 1999 and consist of Alesha Dixon, Sabrina Washington and Su-Elise Nash, although originally Zena McNally was part of the group before departing following the release of their debut single. In February 2005 the group announced they would be splitting to pursue solo careers.

Albums

Studio albums

Compilation albums

Singles

Soundtracks

Promotional singles

References

External links
 Mis-Teeq at AllMusic
 
 

Discographies of British artists
Pop music group discographies